Clergy reserves were tracts of land in Upper Canada and Lower Canada reserved for the support of "Protestant clergy" by the Constitutional Act of 1791. One-seventh of all surveyed Crown lands were set aside, totaling  and  respectively for each Province, and provision was made to dedicate some of those reserved lands as glebe land in support of any parsonage or rectory that may be established by the Church of England. The provincial legislatures could vary or repeal these provisions, but royal assent could not be given before such passed bills having been laid before both houses of the British Parliament for at least thirty days.

Upper Canada

The first lieutenant governor of Upper Canada, John Graves Simcoe, interpreted "Protestant clergy" to mean the clergy of Church of England only. However, in 1823 the Law Officers of the Crown held that the Church of Scotland was also entitled to a share of the revenues under the 1791 Act. Although Lt-Governor Maitland attempted to suppress the publication of that decision, the Legislature passed resolutions the following year that recognized that church's status.

Complications in establishing leasing procedures prevented the reserve lands from being leased before 1803. Until 1819, the reserve lands were managed by the Province, and in most years they earned revenues that were barely sufficient to cover their expenses. After the Rev. John Strachan was appointed to the Executive Council of Upper Canada in 1815, he began to push for the Church of England's autonomous control of the clergy reserves on the model of the Clergy Corporation of Lower Canada, created in 1817. The Clergy Corporation, of which Strachan became the chairman, was subsequently incorporated in 1819 to manage the Clergy Reserves.

The 1819 charter (drafted by Strachan's former student, Attorney General John Beverly Robinson) provided for the Bishop of Quebec to become the perpetual Principal and Director (as he was for the Lower Canada body), who, with twelve other directors, constituted the Board. The Bishop's Official (named by the Bishop) and the rectors of Niagara and York could each serve as acting chairman.

Other perpetual directors were:

 the incumbents at Kingston, Niagara, York, Cornwall, Grimsby, Ancaster and Hamilton; and
 the Inspector General and Surveyor General of the Province of Upper Canada.

Any two directors, together with the Principal or an acting chairman, constituted a quorum, but, because of the poor network of roads, most clergy members were generally unable to attend Corporation meetings. This effectively meant that Strachan (as rector of York), together with the Inspector General and Surveyor General, controlled the Board. These three members were part of the Family Compact, of which Strachan was the leader.

Except in the Talbot Settlement (where they were located off the main roads), they were generally arranged in a checkerboard pattern within each township, and were a serious obstacle to economic development as they were effectively wasteland, either being abandoned by lessees after the timber had been fully harvested, or unattractive because of the availability of cheap freehold land. This was recognized by the Legislative Assembly in 1817 when it passed resolutions that condemned the lands as "insurmountable obstacles" and called on the Parliament in Westminster to authorize their sale.

Until 1827, no reserve lands were sold. They were leased for terms of twenty-one years, with rents on a sliding scale:

Even with higher rates being charged from 1819, total annual revenues were still only £1200 in 1824, and only one-third could be collected without pursuing legal action.

In 1826, the Canada Company was formed to sell off the remaining crown and clergy reserves in the province. However, because of opposition from Strachan, the Company received  in the Huron Tract, in substitution for the originally contemplated  of clergy reserve lands. As the provincial policy of free land grants had come to an end, Strachan lobbied for and secured an Act from the British Parliament granting authority to sell up to one-fourth of all reserve lands, up to  each year, from which there would be income sufficient to support 200300 Anglican clergymen.

In 1836, before Sir John Colborne was succeeded by Sir Francis Bond Head as lieutenant-governor, he created 57 rectories for the Church of England, with glebe land totalling . This action created significant political dissent, and was subsequently declared illegal in 1837, but was later held in 1856 to have been lawful. In the interim, it became one of the issues in the Upper Canada Rebellion of 1837 (and subsequently identified as such in the 1838 report written by Lord Durham), where William Lyon Mackenzie exclaimed to the crowd outside Montgomery's Tavern:

The Parliament of Upper Canada passed a bill to sell the reserves in 1840, but the Governor General reserved the bill for consideration by the British government, which disallowed the bill. The British then enacted the Clergy Reserves in Canada Act 1840 later in that year. Although considered to be more favourable to the Church of England, the Act as passed provided that only one-half of future sales would be dedicated on a 2:1 basis to the Churches of England and Scotland, with the remaining half being distributed to all other churches according to their respective strengths. The administration of the reserve lands was transferred to the Crown Lands Department, where it was handled in a more professional manner.

Lower Canada

Unlike the distribution of lots that was pursued by Simcoe in Upper Canada, Alured Clarke, lieutenant-governor of Lower Canada, instituted a policy of setting aside large blocks of land apart from either current or contiguous settlement.

The Clergy Corporation in Lower Canada, more formally known as the "Corporation for Superintending, Managing and Conducting the Clergy Reserves within the Province of Lower-Canada", was constituted with the Bishop of Quebec (initially the Right Rev. Jacob Mountain) as perpetual Principal and Director, and with rectors of four parishes within the diocese constituted as perpetual directors. In 1828, a British parliamentary committee reported that leases were being granted on certain terms:

The reserve lands generated little income in Lower Canada, with the average annual profit from such activity amounting to only £3 between 1791 and 1837.

Abolition
Pressure arose to reform the entire structure of the reserves, but the government of Robert Baldwin and Louis-Hippolyte Lafontaine chose not to proceed on such a course, because of the resistance of the established churches and the roadblocks presented by the 1791 Act. However, such caution eventually came to be seen as inflexibility, which would be overcome by the rise of the Grit movement in 1850.

Even as late as 1853, Strachan was still campaigning to ensure the Church of England's dominance in the matter. As he stated in a letter to Lord Newcastle:

Following the victory of Augustin-Norbert Morin and Allan MacNab in the 1854 general election, in conjunction with the abolition of seigneurial tenure in Lower Canada, the lands were finally removed from church control and secularized under an Act of the Legislative Assembly of the Province of Canada, under which:

 sales and other revenues from the reserves were constituted as separate funds dedicated to municipal purposes in Upper and Lower Canada, and
 recipients of stipends could cede their life claims to their respective churches, which could in turn commute the sums of such claims at 6% per annum.

Impact and aftermath
Reform of the Clergy Reserves was a major issue in Canadian politics from its creation until its abolition. The controversy stemmed from the fact that many supporters of the religious endowment were part of the Tory ruling class. Even Robert Baldwin, who was the leader of the struggle for Responsible Government did not advocate for complete abolition and chose to resign his seat rather than tackle the question.

In 1867, the Municipalities Funds for Upper and Lower Canada were declared to be part of the joint property of the new provinces of Ontario and Quebec, subject to division and adjustment at a later date by arbitrators appointed under s. 142 of the British North America Act, 1867. The funds were awarded to each province respectively in September 1870, and the award itself was held to be valid by the Judicial Committee of the Privy Council in March 1878. In Ontario, the Fund continued to be accounted for separately until the passage of an Act in 1908, where all special funds were declared to form part of the province's Consolidated Revenue Fund.

See also
 Anglican Church of Canada
 Jesuit Estates Act - religious land settlement occurring in Quebec in 1888
 Queen's Bush

References

Bibliography

Bills

Legal history of Canada
Political history of Canada
Culture of Ontario
History of Christianity in Canada
Religion in Canada